Dr. Kerryn Lee Goldsworthy (born 14 May 1953) is an Australian freelance writer and former academic.

Life and career
Goldsworthy has edited four anthologies of Australian writing. She has also written many articles, essays and reviews.

She has a B.A. and Ph.D. from the University of Adelaide. She taught at the University of Melbourne from 1981 to 1997 as a tutor and lecturer and has also worked briefly at Deakin, Flinders and Adelaide Universities, and at the University of Klagenfurt, in Austria. She was the editor of the Australian Book Review (May 1986 to Dec 1987), decades later she claimed that the experience involved her "learning more about human nature in those two years than in either the preceding thirty-three or the following nineteen."

Goldsworthy also served as a member of the Literature Board of the Australia Council and has also been the recipient of Australia Council grants allocated from its Literature Fund.

In 1997, Kerryn Goldsworthy returned to Adelaide and turned to freelance writing. She was a judge of the prestigious Miles Franklin Award for a year, until she resigned, along with two other judges, over a charter that changed the decision-making powers of the judges. She has also served as a Visiting Research Fellow at the University of Adelaide where she is a guest teacher in the Graduate Certificate course in Food Writing. She also writes for a number of weblogs.
Goldsworthy's political views are left-wing.  She once described herself as "an old fashioned feminist."
In 2013 Goldsworthy was awarded the Pascall Prize 'Australian Critic of the Year', Australia's major national award for criticism. Her essay, The Limit of the World, won her the 2017 Horne Prize.

Bibliography

Books

 Coast to Coast, HarperCollins Publishers (Australia) Pty Ltd (1 November 1986), 
 Australian Love Stories, Oxford University Press (1997), 
 Australian Women's Stories (edited by Kerryn Goldsworthy), Oxford University Press, 
 Australian Short Stories, J.M. Dent & Sons (1986), ASIN B000J6Z1TK
 Helen Garner (Australian Writers series), Oxford University Press, USA (1 May 1997),

Book reviews

References

External links
 Blog

1953 births
Academic staff of the University of Melbourne
Australian Book Review people
Australian literary critics
Women literary critics
Australian bloggers
Living people
Australian women bloggers